Aston is an English surname and occasionally a given name.

Some notable persons with the name:

Scientists 
Sir Aston Webb (1849–1930), English architect and President of the Royal Academy (1919-1924)
 Francis William Aston, Nobel prize winning chemist and physicist, and inventor of the mass spectrograph.
Bernard Aston (1871–1951), English chemist and botanist
Helen Isobel Aston (born 1934), Australian botanist and ornithologist
Mick Aston (1946–2013), British archaeologist
William George Aston (1841–1911), British consular official and Japanologist

In government
Sir Thomas Aston, 1st Baronet (1600-1646), English politician
Walter Aston (burgess) (c. 1606-1656), member of the Virginia House of Burgesses
Arthur Vincent Aston, official in the Malayan civil service
Aston Kajara, minister in Uganda

In sports
Alfred Aston, French footballer and manager
Bill Aston, British racing driver
Ferdie Aston, South African rugby player
Harry Aston (footballer, born 1855), English footballer
Harry Aston (footballer, born 1881), played for West Bromwich Albion and Walsall
Henry Hervey Aston (1759–1798), English cricketer
Jack Aston (1877-1934), English footballer
John Aston Sr., English footballer, father of Aston Jr.
John Aston Jr., English footballer
John Aston (cricketer), Irish cricketer
Karen Aston, American collegiate basketball player and coach
Ken Aston (1915-2001), English footballer
Mark Aston, British rugby player
Randolph Aston (1869-1930), English rugby player
Aston Croall, English rugby player
Aston Moore, Jamaican athlete

In music
Jay Aston, British singer, formerly with the pop group Bucks Fizz
Hugh Aston (c. 1485–1558)
Michael Aston, rock musician
Peter Aston (1938–2013), English composer and conductor
Aston "Family Man" Barrett, Jamaican musician
Aston Merrygold, British lead singer in JLS

Writers
Luise Aston (1814-1871), German writer and feminist
Tilly Aston (1873-1947), blind Australian writer and teacher
Aston Cockayne (1605–1684), well-known Cavalier and minor literary figure
Manny Aston, Australian writer and teacher
Constance Aston, seventeenth century English manuscript author and anthologist (later Constance Aston Fowler)
Elizabeth Aston, English author

In other fields
Arthur Aston (army officer) (1590-1649), professional soldier and supporter of Charles I in the English Civil War
Cawton Aston (active 1693 – 1733), English builder of spinets
Evelin Winifred Aston (1891–1975), English artist
Sam Aston, British child actor

English unisex given names
English-language surnames
English toponymic surnames